Aleksey Shidlovsky (born 19 November 1972) is a Russian track and field athlete. He competed in the men's shot put at the 1996 Summer Olympics.

References

1972 births
Living people
Place of birth missing (living people)
Russian male shot putters
Olympic male shot putters
Olympic athletes of Russia
Athletes (track and field) at the 1996 Summer Olympics
Russian Athletics Championships winners
20th-century Russian people